Karamlu may refer to:
 Karamlu, Ardabil
 Karamlu, East Azerbaijan